Woolston railway station is a grade II listed station serving the suburb of Woolston in the city of Southampton, England. The station is operated by South Western Railway. Just past Woolston station the line rounds the River Itchen giving a view across the city of Southampton, including Southampton FC's ground.

History
The station was built in 1866 in an Italianate style typical of William Tite who designed other stations for the London & South Western Railway company. A single track line was operated by the Southampton & Netley Railway to serve the Royal Victoria Military Hospital at Netley, which station was also built in an Italianate style.

The station, with a train waiting in it, was bombed during a raid on the Spitfire works at Woolston during the Second World War, and suffered damage. The station's extensive goods yard and brick shed was closed in 1967. In June 2010 the railway bridge was replaced.

Services 
South Western Railway operate all off-peak services at Woolston using  EMUs.

The typical off-peak service in trains per hour is:
 1 tph to 
 1 tph to 

Gallery

References

External links 

 

Grade II listed railway stations
Grade II listed buildings in Hampshire
Railway stations in Southampton
DfT Category E stations
Former London and South Western Railway stations
Railway stations in Great Britain opened in 1866
Railway stations served by South Western Railway
1866 establishments in England
Railway stations served by Govia Thameslink Railway